Bordj El Amir Khaled District is a district of Aïn Defla Province, Algeria.

Municipalities
The district is further divided into three municipalities.
Bordj Emir Khaled Chikh
Bir Ould Khelifa
Tarik Ibn Ziad

Districts of Aïn Defla Province